Publications of the Astronomical Society of Australia is a peer-reviewed scientific journal covering all aspects of astrophysics and astronomy. The editor-in-chief is Stanislav Shabala (University of Tasmania). It was established in 1967 and is published by Cambridge University Press on behalf of the Astronomical Society of Australia.

Abstracting and indexing
The journal is abstracted and indexed in:

According to the Journal Citation Reports, the journal has a 2020 impact factor of 5.571.

References

External links

Astronomy journals
Astrophysics journals
English-language journals
Publications established in 1995
Cambridge University Press academic journals
Continuous journals